Pallikkara is a census town and a grama panchayat in Hosdurg Taluk of Kasargod district in the state of Kerala, India. This place was once famous for its Tobacco plants until the late 1980s and the Historical landmark Bekal Fort lies in this Village. A beach park near to the fort also attracts tourists to this place.

Location

It lies 11 km north of Kanhangad town and 16.5 km from Kasaragod.

Demographics
As of 2011 Census, Pallikkara had a population of 14,334 of which 6,611 are males and 7,723 are females. The sex ratio of Pallikkara was 1,168 higher than state average of 1,084. Population of children under 6 years was 15%. Pallikkara had overall literacy of 89% lower than state average of 94%. The male literacy stands at 92.7% and female literacy was 86%.

Economy
Pallikkara is one of the developing villages in Pallikkere Grama Panchayath. Agriculture is the occupation of majority of the population. Income through agriculture related works, construction works and foreign money are the main sources of income.

Transportation
Local roads have access to NH.66 which connects to Kasaragod, Mangalore in the north and Kannur, Calicut in the south. The nearest railway station is Bekal Fort Railway Station, Kanhangad Railway Station on Mangalore-Palakkad line. The nearest airports are at Mangalore , Kannur and Calicut.

Image gallery

References

Kanhangad area